Tetrorchidium is a genus of flowering plants in the family Euphorbiaceae first described in 1841. It is native to tropical portions of Africa and the Western Hemisphere.

Species

References

Adenoclineae
Euphorbiaceae genera
Taxa named by Eduard Friedrich Poeppig